Kankali Tila (also Kankali mound or Jaini mound) is a mound located at Mathura in the Indian state of Uttar Pradesh. The name of the mound is derived from a modern temple of Hindu goddess Kankali. The famous Jain stupa was excavated here in 1890-91 by Alois Anton Führer (Dr. Führer).

The mound almost rectangular in shape is 500 feet long by 350 feet broad. Kankali Tila brought forth many treasures of Jain art. The archaeological findings testifies the existence of two Jain temples and stupas. Numerous Jain sculptures, Ayagapattas (tablet of homage), pillars, crossbeams and lintels were found during archaeological excavations.
Some of the sculptures are provided with inscriptions that report on the contemporary society and organization of the Jain community. 

Most sculptures could be dated from the 2nd century BC to the 12th century CE, thus representing a continuous period of about 14 centuries during which Jainism flourished at Mathura. These sculptures are now housed in the Lucknow State Museum and in the Mathura Museum.

Excavation 

Alexander Cunningham worked at the western end in March and November 1871. The objects found by Mr. Cunningham were all Jain, with the exception of one ten-armed Brahmanical figure. Mr. Growse operated on the northern portion in 1875. In Volume XVII of the "Reports" (page 111), Mr. Cunningham noted that in the season of 1881-82 he dug up many Jain figures, including one inscribed with the name of Vardhamana, the last of the 24 Jain Tirthankara. Dr. Burgess and Dr. Fuhrer extended the excavations to the eastern end at different times from 1887 to 1896. Mr. Harding, a predecessor of Mr. Growse as Magistrate of Mathura, also made some excavations. The excavations at Kankali Tila acted as a testimony to the claims made by Jains regarding the great antiquity of their religion.

Images of Neminatha found in Kankali Tila dating back to Kushan period depicts him as a cousin of Krishna and Balarama.

Significance 
The sculptures and the inscriptions found at Kankali Tila suggest that in that period a clear Digambar-Shwetabar division had not risen. The Tirthankar images are all unclothed and monks are represented as not wearing a loincloth, but with cloth on one forearm. The names of divisions of the monastic orders match exactly with those given in the Kalpasutra.

Gallery

See also 

 Jainism

References

Citations

Sources 

 

Jain architecture
Mathura
Mathura art